Palkulangara is an urban neighbourhood of Thiruvananthapuram, the capital of the Indian state of Kerala.

Location
Palkulangara  is around 1 km from  Pettah Junction, 700 m from West Fort Junction and 1.5 km from Chakkai bypass Junction. The nearest Airport is Trivandrum International Airport and Pettah Railway Station is the nearest Railway Station. The place is famous for the presence of Palkulangara Devi Temple, one of the most ancient temples in Kerala, which preserves the beauty and atmosphere gifted by nature

Religion
The population of Palkulangara mainly practices Hinduism. The area predominantly consists of people from the Nair community.

Religious Places
 Palkulangara Devi Temple
 Cheriyaudeswaram Mahavishnu Temple also known as 'Appuppan kovil'.

Main Landmarks
 NSS Higher Secondary School Palkulangara.
 Punjab National Bank
 NSS Karayogam

References

External links

 About Pettah Railway Station

Suburbs of Thiruvananthapuram